TJ Sokol Lanžhot is a Czech football club located in the town of Lanžhot. It currently plays in the Czech Fourth Division.

Historical names 

 1922 – SK Lanžhot (Sportovní klub Lanžhot)
 1948 – JTO Sokol Lanžhot (Jednotná tělovýchovná organisace Sokol Lanžhot)
 1953 – DSO Sokol Lanžhot (Dobrovolná sportovní organisace Sokol Lanžhot)
 1957 – TJ Sokol Lanžhot (Tělovýchovná jednota Sokol Lanžhot)
 2010 – TJ Sokol Podluží (Tělovýchovná jednota Sokol Podluží)
 2010 – TJ Sokol Lanžhot (Tělovýchovná jednota Sokol Lanžhot)

Football clubs in the Czech Republic
Association football clubs established in 1922
Břeclav District